Caroline Agnes Brady (also known as Caroline Agnes Von Egmont Brady; October 3, 1905 – November 5, 1980) was an American philologist who specialised in Old English and Old Norse works. Her works included the 1943 book The Legends of Ermanaric, based on her doctoral dissertation, and three influential papers on the Anglo-Saxon poem Beowulf. She taught at the University of California, Berkeley, the University of Pennsylvania, Johns Hopkins University, and Harvard University, among other places. 

Brady was born an American citizen in Tientsin, China, and traveled frequently as a child, spending time in Los Angeles, California, British Columbia, and Austin, Texas. She studied in the University of California system, receiving her bachelor's and master's degrees, and her Ph.D. in 1935. She next became an English instructor at that university's College of Agriculture, and worked as an assistant professor of languages and literature at Berkeley from 1941 to 1946. The following three years were spent at the University of Pennsylvania, until, at the end of 1949, Brady moved to teach at Central Oregon Community College; her resignation due to "ill health" was announced a few months later. After being named the 1952–53 Marion Talbot Fellow of the American Association of University Women and writing two articles, Brady's scholarship ceased for a quarter of a century. In 1979, and posthumously in 1983, her final two articles were published.

Brady's monograph, The Legends of Ermanaric, argued that the Gothic king Ermanaric was subject to two competing traditions, and earned her a reputation as "a broad and discriminating investigator" with "a sovereign disregard of established opinion". Her papers on Beowulf, meanwhile, were identified by Katherine O'Brien O'Keeffe, a scholar of Anglo-Saxon literature, as "three fundamental studies" that were "philological in the traditional sense", shedding light on "the shades of meaning of the diction" used in the poem. Brady concluded that the Beowulf poet "is no artificer mechanically piling up synonyms and conventional metaphors, but an artist who knows how to use a variety of words and phrases".

Early life and education 
Caroline Agnes Brady was born on October 3, 1905, in Tientsin, China. She was the daughter of United States Army Colonel David John Brady, an engineer who was then the general manager of the Chinese Engineering and Mining Company in Qinhuangdao, and his wife (Annie Lucy) Maude Short, daughter of John Short, the deputy prothonotary of Sherbrooke, Quebec. The two had married the year before, at the Holy Trinity Church in Shanghai. Caroline was one of two children, and the eldest by ten years of her sister, Frances Maud Brady. Her father, the son of British emigrants, had been raised in Austin, Texas, and traveled as the army took him. His two brothers, John W. and Will P. Brady—Caroline Brady's uncles—both became prominent Texas attorneys and jurists. Will P. Brady worked as the first district attorney of Reeves County, Texas, and later as a judge of the county court in El Paso. John W. Brady rose to prominence within Austin, and Texas generally, as an assistant attorney general and judge, before killing his mistress in 1929 and being sentenced to three years in prison. Caroline Brady's mother, meanwhile, traced back through four generations of her matriline to Anthony Van Egmond (Caroline Brady's great-great-great-grandfather), an early settler of Canada, whose true identity as the Dutch fugitive Antonij Jacobi Willem Gijben—not, as he claimed, as a direct descent of the counts of Egmond—was not uncovered until the second half of the twentieth century.

In May 1910, when Brady was four, her family arrived in Los Angeles, California, via Shanghai, aboard the steamer Bessie Dollar. The ship carried only two families and a woman traveling alone, in addition to a cargo of pig iron, and had what the Los Angeles Herald described as "a rough voyage across the Pacific", striking a whale. By the end of the year, the family was living in British Columbia. Though the Herald had described Brady's father as a Standard Oil engineer, by the end of World War I he was serving overseas as part of the Rainbow Division of the United States Army National Guard, in France and Germany as first a captain and then a major. During these years, until about September 1919, Caroline Brady and her family stayed with her uncle, John W. Brady, in his large Austin house. David Brady returned in August or September 1919; by the following year he was working with his brother Will at the Los Angeles-based Sunshine Oil Corporation.

In August 1924 Brady matriculated at the University of California at Los Angeles (UCLA), then known as the Southern Branch of the University of California. She entered Teachers College, for studies in kindergarten-primary education. Brady was active in a number of organizations at UCLA, including Beta Phi Alpha, the YWCA, and the Prytanean Society, of which she was president. She graduated with a Bachelor of Arts in English in 1928, and two years later, on May 15, 1930, received a Master of Arts from the school's Berkeley campus. That same year she began her Ph.D., also at Berkeley, and graduated in 1935, with the thesis The Legends of Ermanaric. Her dissertation committee was chaired by Arthur Gilchrist Brodeur, with whom Brady would coauthor an article five years later.

Name 

Brady is occasionally referred to as Caroline Agnes Von Egmont Brady. Though her published output universally refers to her as either "Caroline A. Brady" or "Caroline Brady", the program for her dissertation defense names her "Caroline Agnes Von Egmont Brady". Several library entries and membership lists of the Modern Language Association also use the longer name.

Career 
In 1935, the same year that she received her Ph.D., Brady became an English instructor at the College of Agriculture at the University of California. Brady was promoted on July 13, 1941 to assistant professor of languages and literature at the Berkeley campus. In 1943, her "completely rewritten" dissertation was published under the same title, The Legends of Ermanaric. Brady continued teaching at Berkeley until 1946. Thereafter, she taught for three years at the University of Pennsylvania as an assistant professor of English.

In 1949 Brady moved to Klamath Falls, Oregon, as one of the four inaugural instructors for the newly opened Central Oregon Community College. The college had campuses at both Bend and Klamath Falls; Brady taught at both, offering courses in English Composition and Survey of English Literature. After only a few months in the position, Brady resigned, citing "ill health".

By May 1952, Brady was working as the synonym editor for C. L. Barnhart, Inc., the publisher of Thorndike-Barnhart dictionaries, in Bronxville, New York. That year she was named the 1952–53 Marion Talbot Fellow of the American Association of University Women. The $2,200 fellowship was for "a study and reinterpretation of the substantial compounds and phrases in Old English poetry", looking at contextual word usage to "determine whether the various poets used them in exactly the same way". Brady's work was to take place at Johns Hopkins and Harvard, and in 1952 she published two related articles: "The Synonyms for 'Sea' in Beowulf", and "The Old English Nominal Compounds in -rád".

Brady's subsequent activities are unclear. In 1979, she was listed again with a California address. That year, she published the second piece in her Beowulf trilogy, Weapons' in Beowulf." The final work in the trilogy, Warriors' in Beowulf," was published posthumously, in 1983.

Personal life
In her 1941 Who's Who in California entry, Brady was described as a Democrat and an Episcopalian. Her father died in late January 1953, and her mother in November 1959. Caroline Brady died on November 5, 1980, in Bellevue, Washington. The year before she was listed with an address in Corona del Mar  by Anglo-Saxon England, the journal that published her final two works. Brady's sister, by then Frances Brady Ackley, died on December 14, 1993; her obituary mentioned only cousins among her survivors.

Publications 
Brady's book The Legends of Ermanaric suggests the Gothic king Ermanaric, who ruled in the fourth century AD, was the subject of two competing traditions: one, in Ostrogothic lore, viewing him as a good king, and a second, promulgated by those subjugated by him, as evil. Brady's thesis gained less traction than her ability to investigate the intractable problems of Germanic myth, and the convoluted nature of the related scholarship. She was noted as "a broad and discriminating investigator", who had "a sovereign disregard of established opinion". Such disregard caused one reviewer to label Brady's work "more valuable in the sphere of criticism than construction," and another to note that her "conclusions are reached without reliance on the views of predecessors, and one may be sure that, in some quarters, the volume will be thoroughly combed for flaws to match those it has uncovered in the reasoning of others". Indeed, after Brady's "vigorous tilting with no less a scholar than Kemp Malone," he penned two separate reviews disparaging what he termed her scholastic immaturity, and suggesting "she overestimates the worth of debaters' points". Others shared concerns with Brady's thesis while being generally supportive, including the Old English scholar Philip W. Souers, who wrote that:

Brady's 1979 and 1983 articles on the words used to describe weapons and warriors in the Anglo-Saxon poem Beowulf suggested that, unlike the interchangeability of words used for other subjects such as strong drink, the words used to describe weapons and warriors were precisely tailored to fit their specific contexts. Taken with her 1952 article "The Synonyms for 'Sea' in Beowulf ", these are described by Katherine O'Brien O'Keeffe in A Beowulf Handbook as "three fundamental studies" that examine the context in which the Beowulf poet chose a word rather than simply the word itself. Brady concluded that "this poet is no artificer mechanically piling up synonyms and conventional metaphors, but an artist who knows how to use a variety of words and phrases". Her approach was considered "philological in the traditional sense" by O'Keeffe, and to have shed light on "the shades of meaning of the diction" used in the poem.

In addition to her book and the Beowulf articles, Brady published a number of other works during her career. She also presented several papers, including some which ultimately went unpublished, at academic conferences—notably at meetings of the Philological Association of the Pacific Coast and the Modern Language Association.

Books

Articles

Reviews

Notes

References

Bibliography 

  
  
  
 
  
  
  
  
  
  
  
  
  
  
  
 
  
  
  
 

1905 births
1980 deaths
Educators from Tianjin
20th-century philologists
American philologists
Women philologists
University of California, Berkeley College of Letters and Science faculty
University of Pennsylvania faculty
University of California, Los Angeles alumni
University of California, Berkeley alumni
Anglo-Saxon studies scholars
Writers from Tianjin
American expatriates in China